The 1907 All-Western college football team consists of American football players selected to the All-Western teams chosen by various selectors for the 1907 college football season. One player, Germany Schulz, was also a consensus All-American.

All-Western selections

Ends
 Harry S. Hammond, Michigan (CA, CDN, CE, CIO, CJ, COL, CRH, WE)
 Hewitt, Chicago (CA, CDN, CP, CRH)
 Harlan Page, Chicago (CIO, CJ, CP) (CBHOF)
 Harlan Rogers, Wisconsin (CE)

Tackles
 Walter Rheinschild, Michigan (CA, CDN, CE, COL, CP, CRH, WE)
 John Messmer, Wisconsin (CA, CIO, CJ, COL [guard], CRH, WE [guard])
 George Leland Case, Minnesota (CDN, CIO, CP, WE)
 Ivan Doseff, Chicago (CE, CJ, COL)

Guards
 Forest Van Hook, Illinois (CA, CDN, CE, CIO, CJ, COL, CP, CRH, WE)
 Walter D. Graham, Michigan (CIO, CJ, CP, CRH)
 William John Bandelin, Minnesota (CA, CE)
 Harris, Chicago (CDN)

Centers
 Germany Schulz, Michigan (CA, CDN, CE, CIO, CJ, COL, CP, CRH, WE) (CFHOF)

Quarterbacks
 Walter Steffen, Chicago (CA, CDN, CE, CIO, CJ, COL, CP, CRH, WE) (CFHOF)

Halfbacks
 Leo DeTray, Chicago (CA [fullback], CDN, CE, CIO, CJ, COL, CP, CRH [fullback], WE)
 Carroll N. Kirk, Iowa (CA, CE, CRH)
 John Robert Schuknecht, Minnesota (CIO, CJ, COL [fullback])
 Harold Iddings, Chicago (CDN, COL [end], WE)
 Oscar Osthoff, Wisconsin (CP)

Fullbacks
 George Capron, Minnesota (CA [halfback], CDN, CE, CIO, CJ, COL [halfback], CP, CRH [halfback], WE [end])
 John H. Weller, Nebraska (WE)

Key
Bold = consensus choice by a majority of the selectors

CA = Chicago American

CDN = Chicago Daily News

CE = Chicago Examiner

CIO = Chicago Inter-Ocean

CJ = Chicago Journal

COL = Collier's Weekly

CP = Chicago Evening Post

CRH = Chicago Record-Herald

WE = Walter Eckersall for the Chicago Tribune

CFHOF = College Football Hall of Fame

CBHOF = College Basketball Hall of Fame

See also
1907 College Football All-America Team

References

All-Western team
All-Western college football teams